KSSU may refer to:

 KSSU aircraft maintenance consortium (KLM, Swissair, SAS and UTA); see Union de Transports Aériens
 KSSU (AM), the internet radio station of California State University, Sacramento
 KSSU (FM), a radio station (91.9 FM) licensed to Durant, Oklahoma, United States
 Kirby Super Star Ultra, a Nintendo DS video game